Glasgow Pollok was a burgh constituency represented in the House of Commons of the Parliament of the United Kingdom from 1918 until 2005, when it was replaced by Glasgow South West. It elected one Member of Parliament (MP) using the first-past-the-post voting system.

Boundaries 

1918–1945: "That portion of the city which is bounded by a line commencing at a point on the municipal boundary at the centre line of the Glasgow and Paisley Joint Railway, thence eastward along the centre line of the said Glasgow and Paisley Joint Railway and the Caledonian Railway to the centre line of Shields Road, thence southward along the centre line of Shields Road to the centre line of the Glasgow and South Western Railway (Paisley Canal Line), thence, eastward along the centre line of the said Glasgow and South Western Railway to the centre line of Eglinton Street, thence southward along the centre line of Eglinton Street and Victoria Road to the centre line of Queen's Drive, thence southward along the centre line of the main avenue in the Queen's Park to the centre line of Langside Road, thence south-westward along the centre line of Langside Road to the centre line of Millbrae Road, thence south-westward along the centre line of Millbrae Road and Langside Road to the centre line of the River Cart at Millbrae Bridge, thence westward and north-westward along the centre line of the River Cart to the centre line of Kilmarnock Road, thence southward along the centre line of Kilmarnock Road to the municipal boundary, thence northwestward, south-westward, northward, westward and northward along the municipal boundary to the point of commencement."

Members of Parliament

Election results

Elections of the 2000s

Elections of the 1990s

Elections of the 1980s

Elections of the 1970s

Elections of the 1960s

Elections in the 1950s

Elections of the 1940s

Elections of the 1930s

Elections of the 1920s

References 

Historic parliamentary constituencies in Scotland (Westminster)
Constituencies of the Parliament of the United Kingdom established in 1918
Constituencies of the Parliament of the United Kingdom disestablished in 2005
Politics of Glasgow